Agaya is a village in Bankura I Sub District in Bankura district, West Bengal, India.

Demographics
According to 2011 census of India, the village has a population of 912; 
Male= 461
Female= 451 .

References

Villages in Bankura district